Films produced in Spain in the 1960s ordered by year of release on separate pages:

List of films by year
Spanish films of 1960
Spanish films of 1961
Spanish films of 1962
Spanish films of 1963
Spanish films of 1964
Spanish films of 1965
Spanish films of 1966
Spanish films of 1967
Spanish films of 1968
Spanish films of 1969

External links
 Spanish film at the Internet Movie Database

Lists of 1960s films
Films